DJ Paypal is a footwork producer. Born in North Carolina, they reside in Berlin and are a member of the Teklife crew. They have often performed live with their face hidden for reasons of anonymity. Their 2015 debut album, Sold Out, was released on Brainfeeder to generally favorable reviews.

Discography
Studio albums
 Sold Out (2015)
 174.2.2 (2018)

EPs
 Why (2012)
 Drake Edits (2014)
 Buy Now (2015)

Singles
 "IRL" (2013)
 "Dose" (2016)
 "F.U.I.T.H" (2020)

References

External links
 
 

Year of birth missing (living people)
Living people
Record producers from North Carolina
People from North Carolina